The Fujitsu FLEPia is a discontinued e-reader capable of displaying up to 260,000 colors. Released in Japan in 2009.

Specifications
 Size: 158 mm x 240 mm x 12.5 mm
 Weight: 385 g
 Display: 8 inch
 Resolution: 768 x 1024 pixels
 Number of displayable colors: 260,000 colors (3 scans); 4,096 (2 scans); 64 colors (1 scan)
 Re-Draw Speed: 1.8 seconds (1 scan), 5 seconds (2 scans), 8 seconds (3 scans)
 Memory: SD Memory Card (Maximum up to 4GB)
 Battery: 40 continuous hours (displaying 2,400 pages/at 1 minute per page/with 64 colors)
 Wireless: WiFi and Bluetooth
 MSRP: 99,750 JPY (~$1075)
 Available case colors: white and black.

References

External links
 Technology Review - A Color E-Reader
 PC World - Fujitsu Launches Color E-Paper Terminal: Bad News for Kindle?

Dedicated ebook devices
Electronic paper technology
Fujitsu products
Windows CE devices